Canute Anderson (April 14, 1830 – July 31, 1893) was a member of the Wisconsin State Assembly.

Biography
Anderson was born on April 14, 1830 in Lærdal, Norway. In 1851, he moved to Sterling, Polk County, Wisconsin. In 1854, he moved to Burnett County, Wisconsin where for  several years he was the lone resident in that area. He married Catherine Nelson, an immigrant from Sweden. They had twelve children. Known as the "Father of Burnett County," Anderson established Grantsburg, Wisconsin. He died on July 31, 1893 after being struck in the head by a hay pole while stacking hay.

Career
Anderson was a member of the Assembly in 1878 and 1883. In addition, he was Postmaster and Chairman of the Town Board of Grantsburg (town), Wisconsin, County Treasurer of Burnett County and a Presidential Elector. When he died, he was chairman (similar to mayor) of the joint townships of Grantsburg and Anderson, Burnett County, Wisconsin. He was a Republican.

References

External links
The Historical Marker Database

The Political Graveyard

People from Lærdal
Norwegian emigrants to the United States
People from Polk County, Wisconsin
People from Burnett County, Wisconsin
Republican Party members of the Wisconsin State Assembly
Mayors of places in Wisconsin
Wisconsin postmasters
American Lutherans
1830 births
1893 deaths
Burials in Wisconsin
19th-century American politicians
People from Grantsburg, Wisconsin
19th-century Lutherans